The golden-winged tody-flycatcher (Poecilotriccus calopterus) is a species of bird in the family Tyrannidae, and one of twelve in the genus Poecilotriccus.

Distribution and habitat
It is found in Colombia, Ecuador, and Peru.  Its natural habitat is subtropical or tropical moist lowland forests.

References

golden-winged tody-flycatcher
Birds of the Colombian Amazon
Birds of the Peruvian Amazon
Birds of the Ecuadorian Amazon
golden-winged tody-flycatcher
golden-winged tody-flycatcher
Taxonomy articles created by Polbot